A speechwriter is a person who is hired to prepare and write speeches that will be delivered by another person. Speechwriters are employed by many senior-level elected officials and executives in the government and private sectors. They can also be employed to write for weddings and other social occasions.

Skills and training
A speechwriter works directly with senior executives or leaders to determine what points, themes, positions, or messages the executive would like to cover. Speechwriters need to be able to accept criticism and comments on the different drafts of the speech, and be able to incorporate the proposed changes into the draft. Speechwriters have to be able to work on several different speeches at once, and manage their time so that they can meet strict deadlines for finishing the speech on time. Speechwriters must also be able to accept anonymity, because with few exceptions, speechwriters are not officially credited or acknowledged. This aspect creates a dilemma for historians and compilers of speech anthology; namely, when some poignant phrase gains popularity such as John F. Kennedy's "ask not what your country can do for you, ask what you can do for your country,". Should credit be given to the President, to speechwriter Ted Sorensen, or to both? 

While there is a guild called "The UK Speechwriters' Guild" for professional speechwriters, they do not usually have specific training in the area or field for which they are writing speeches. Instead, speechwriters often have a broad understanding of basic economics, political roles, and policy issues, which make them generalists who are able to "translate" complex economic and policy issues into a clear message for the general public. As with many other writing occupations, most speechwriters do not have specific training in their writing craft. Instead, speechwriters often develop their speech writing skills by combining a general liberal arts education (e.g., in political science, philosophy, or English literature) with a variety of work experience in politics, public administration, journalism, or a related field.

Speechwriting process

Writing a speech involves several steps. A speechwriter has to meet with the executive and the executive's senior staff to determine the broad framework of points or messages that the executive wants to cover in the speech. Then, the speechwriter does his or her own research on the topic to flesh out this framework with anecdotes and examples. The speechwriter will also consider the audience for the speech, which can range from a town-hall meeting of community leaders to an international leaders' forum. Then the speechwriter blends the points, themes, positions, and messages with his or her own research to create an "informative, original and authentic speech" for the executive. 

The speechwriter then presents a draft version of the speech to the executive (or the executive's staff) and makes notes on any revisions or changes that are requested. If the speechwriter is familiar with the topic and the positions and style of the executive, only small changes may be needed. In other cases, the executive may feel that the speech does not have the right tone or flow, and the entire speech may have to be re-drafted. Professional speechwriter Lawrence Bernstein writes:

The delivery of the speech is part of the challenge speechwriters face when crafting the message. Executive speechwriter Anthony Trendl writes:

Notable speechwriters
Some of the world's most notable political speechwriters include:

Australia
Don Watson wrote for Prime Minister Paul Keating

Bangladesh
Md. Nazrul Islam Chowdhury wrote for Prime Minister Sheikh Hasina

Chile
Jaime Guzmán wrote for Chilean military dictator Augusto Pinochet

Europe
 wrote for Chancellor of Germany Angela Merkel
Henri Guaino wrote for French President Nicolas Sarkozy
Sir Ronald Millar wrote for British Prime Minister Margaret Thatcher

Nigeria
Reuben Abati, wrote for President Goodluck Jonathan
Olusegun Adeniyi, wrote for President Umaru Musa Yar'Adua
Farooq Kperogi, wrote for President Olusegun Obasanjo

United States
 Michael Anton wrote for President Donald Trump
 Aram Bakshian wrote for Presidents Richard Nixon and Gerald Ford
 Samuel Beer wrote for President Franklin D. Roosevelt
 Josef Berger wrote for Presidents Harry S. Truman and Lyndon B. Johnson
 Pat Buchanan wrote for President Richard Nixon
 Christopher Buckley wrote for President George H. W. Bush
 Andrei Cherny wrote for President Bill Clinton
 William Dodd wrote for President Woodrow Wilson
 Anthony R. Dolan wrote for President Ronald Reagan
 Ben T. Elliott wrote for President Ronald Reagan
 George Elsey wrote for President Harry Truman
 William B. Ewald Jr. wrote for President Dwight Eisenhower
 James Fallows wrote for President Jimmy Carter
 Jon Favreau wrote for President Barack Obama
 Andrew Ferguson wrote for President George H. W. Bush
 Charlie Fern wrote for President George W. Bush and for First Lady Laura Bush
 David Frum wrote for President George W. Bush
 Adam Garfinkle wrote for President George W. Bush
 David Gergen wrote for President Richard Nixon
 Michael Gerson wrote for President George W. Bush
 George Gilder wrote for President Richard Nixon
 Richard N. Goodwin wrote for presidents John F. Kennedy and Lyndon B. Johnson
 Josh Gottheimer wrote for President Bill Clinton
 Historians believe Alexander Hamilton may have written speeches for President George Washington
 Bob Hardesty wrote for President Lyndon B. Johnson
 Jeffrey Hart wrote for President Richard Nixon
 Robert T. Hartmann wrote for President Gerald Ford
 Ken Hechler wrote for President Harry Truman
 Hendrik Hertzberg wrote for President Jimmy Carter
 Emmet John Hughes wrote for President Dwight D. Eisenhower
 David Humphreys wrote for President George Washington
 Sarah Hurwitz wrote for President Barack Obama
 Michael Johns wrote for President George H. W. Bush
 Hugh S. Johnson wrote for President Franklin D. Roosevelt
 Mark Katz wrote for President Bill Clinton
 Ken Khachigian wrote for Presidents Richard Nixon and Ronald Reagan
 Arthur Larson wrote for President Dwight Eisenhower
 Matt Latimer wrote for President George W. Bush
 Henry Lee IV wrote for President Andrew Jackson
 David Litt wrote for President Barack Obama
 Jon Lovett wrote for President Barack Obama
 Chris Matthews wrote for President Jimmy Carter
 William McGurn wrote for President George W. Bush
 John McLaughlin wrote for President Richard Nixon
 Harry J. Middleton wrote for President Lyndon B. Johnson
 Stephen Miller wrote for President Donald Trump
 Raymond Moley wrote for President Franklin D. Roosevelt
 Malcolm Moos wrote for President Dwight Eisenhower
 Peggy Noonan wrote for presidents Ronald Reagan and George H. W. Bush
 Jay Nordlinger wrote for President George W. Bush
 Robert Orben wrote for President Gerald Ford
 Mark Palmer wrote for President Ronald Reagan
 Landon Parvin wrote for Presidents Ronald Reagan, George H. W. Bush and George W. Bush
 John Podhoretz wrote for Presidents Ronald Reagan and George H. W. Bush 
 Ray Price wrote for Presidents Richard Nixon and Gerald Ford
 Aneesh Raman wrote for President Barack Obama 
 Katherine Reback wrote for President Bill Clinton
 Peter Robinson wrote for Presidents Ronald Reagan and George H. W. Bush
 Samuel Rosenman wrote for Presidents Franklin D. Roosevelt and Harry S. Truman
 William Safire wrote for President Richard Nixon
 Arthur M. Schlesinger Jr. wrote for President John F. Kennedy
 Matthew Scully wrote for President George W. Bush
 Walter Shapiro wrote for President Jimmy Carter
 Michael A. Sheehan wrote for President Bill Clinton
 Robert E. Sherwood wrote for President Franklin D. Roosevelt
 Jeff Shesol wrote for President Bill Clinton
 David Shipley wrote for President Bill Clinton
 Raymond Siller wrote for presidents Richard Nixon, Ronald Reagan, George H. W. Bush, and George W. Bush
 Curt Smith wrote for President George H. W. Bush
 Tony Snow wrote for President George H. W. Bush
 Ted Sorensen wrote for President John F. Kennedy 
 Ben Stein wrote for President Richard Nixon
 Marc Thiessen wrote for President George W. Bush
 Michael Waldman wrote for President Bill Clinton
 Orson Welles wrote for President Franklin D. Roosevelt
 Judson T. Welliver, considered the first official presidential speechwriter in the modern sense of the occupation, wrote for President Warren G. Harding and Calvin Coolidge
 Mari Maseng Will wrote for President Ronald Reagan

Fictional speechwriters
Some fictional speechwriters include: 

James Hobert (played by Alexander Chaplin), speechwriter for the fictional Mayor of New York City Randall Winston on Spin City. 
Toby Ziegler (played by Richard Schiff), Sam Seaborn (played by Rob Lowe), and Will Bailey (played by Joshua Malina) all wrote for the Bartlet administration on The West Wing

See also
 Ghostwriter, a professional writer who is paid to write books, articles, stories, or reports which are officially credited to another person
 Judson Welliver Society, a social club of former presidential speechwriters

References

External links

Political occupations
 
Writing occupations